Thenum Vayambum is a 1981 Indian Malayalam-language film directed by Ashok Kumar and written by John Paul, starring Nedumudi Venu, Prem Nazir and Sumalatha, along with Mohanlal and Ranipadmini. The film features music composed by Raveendran.

Cast
Nedumudi Venu as Ravi
Prem Nazir as V. C. Menon
Sumalatha as Sreedevi
Mohanlal as Varma
Khaja Sharif as Sunil
Ranipadmini as Asha Nair
Poojappura Ravi as Laundryman
Sankaradi as Warrier
Sukumari as Varma's mother
Balachandra Menon as Babu Mathew
Alummoodan as Khader Ikka
C. I. Paul as School Principal
Santhakumari as Mary Thomas
Maya as Mrs. Menon

Soundtrack

The soundtrack for the film was composed by Raveendran with the lyrics penned by Bichu Thirumala.

References

External links
 

1981 films
1980s Malayalam-language films
Films scored by Raveendran